Horatio Ballard (August 1803 – October 8, 1879) was an American lawyer and politician who was New York Secretary of State from January 1, 1862, to December 31, 1863.

Life
He was born in Homer, New York in 1803 and educated in the Pompey and Cortland Academies.  He studied law with Judge Stephens of Cortland and Freeborn G. Jewett of Skaneateles.  After being admitted to practice at the age of twenty-four, he partnered with Stephens in Cortland for many years.  In 1842, he succeeded Shankland as district attorney.  He was a delegate to the 1844 and 1856 Democratic National Conventions. On June 9, 1847, he married Sarah N. Fairchild. He was elected Secretary of State of New York in 1861. He was a member of the New York State Assembly (Cortland Co.) in 1867. He was a delegate to the New York State Constitutional Convention of 1867–68, playing an important role. He died at his residence in Cortland, N.Y.

References
 Obituary transcribed from The Cortland County Democrat, on October 10, 1879
 Political Graveyard (stating erroneously that he was Consul in Havana, in fact he was nominated, but rejected by the Senate)

 

People from Homer, New York
1803 births
1879 deaths
Members of the New York State Assembly
Secretaries of State of New York (state)
19th-century American politicians